Greene Historic District is a national historic district located at Greene in Chenango County, New York.

The district includes 141 contributing buildings and one contributing site. It includes the main commercial area and the oldest residential neighborhoods, with notable public buildings interspersed.  The commercial structures are two or three story frame or brick buildings and include the Sherwood Hotel (1913).  Other notable ecclesiastical and public buildings include the Municipal Building (1886), Moore Public Library (1903), Zion Episcopal Church (1886, designed by Henry M. Congdon), Church of the Immaculate Conception (1834), First Congregational Church (1820), and Central Baptist Church (1901). Located within the district is the separately listed Clinton-Rosekrans Law Building.

It was added to the National Register of Historic Places in 1982.

Gallery

References

Historic districts on the National Register of Historic Places in New York (state)
Historic districts in Chenango County, New York
National Register of Historic Places in Chenango County, New York